The Rwanda national football team represents Rwanda in international football and is controlled by the Rwandese Association Football Federation, the governing body of football in Rwanda, and competes as a member of the Confederation of African Football (CAF), as well as the Council for East and Central Africa Football Associations (CECAFA), a CAF sub-confederation that governs football in East and Central Africa. The team bears the nickname Amavubi (Kinyarwanda for The Wasps), and primarily plays its home games at the Stade Amahoro in Kigali, the nation's capital. They have never qualified for a World Cup finals, and reached their only Africa Cup of Nations in 2004.

History
Rwanda qualified for its first Africa Cup of Nations in the 2004 edition. At the tournament, they lost their opening match 2–1 to Tunisia before winning their first ever point in the competition after a 1–1 draw against Guinea. Rwanda went on to beat DR Congo in their final group match by a 1–0 scoreline, but it wasn't enough, as elsewhere in the group, Guinea and Tunisia drew, meaning both teams progressed to the quarter-finals, and Rwanda were eliminated.

Team image

Kit
In 2001, after adopting the new flag of Rwanda, The Federation (FERWAFA) changed the color of the team kit. The new team kit consists of a yellow jersey, blue shorts and green socks for home matches, while their away kit is either  all white or all blue. Adidas has generally been the manufacturer for the Rwandan team since 2001. However, between 2004 and 2009, Rwanda used L-sport as their outfitter, and in 2015 the side started wearing kit provided by AMS, an emerging Australian supplier.

Names
Under the official FIFA Trigramme the team's name is abbreviated as RWA; this acronym is used by FIFA, the CAF and the CECAFA to identify the team in official competitions. However the team was more commonly known as the RR, the acronym for the country's official name, Repubulika y'u Rwanda or République du Rwanda, which the local press used when they referred to the team as the RR XI. The national team is often referred to as Amavubi (The Wasps).

Recent results

2022

2023

Coaching history
Caretaker managers are listed in italics.

  Otto Pfister (1972–76)
  Metin Türel (1991)
  Longin Rudasingwa (1998-1999)
  Rudi Gutendorf (1999–00)
  Longin Rudasingwa (2000–01)
  Ratomir Dujković (2001–04)
  Roger Palmgren (2004–05)
  Michael Nees (2006–07)
  Josip Kuže (2007–08)
  Raoul Shungu (2008)
  Branko Tucak (2008–09)
  Eric Nshimiyimana (2009–10)
  Sellas Tetteh (2010–11)
  Milutin Sredojević (2011–13)
  Eric Nshimiyimana (2013–14)
  Stephen Constantine (2014–2015)
  Lee Johnson (2015)
  Johnny McKinstry (2015–16)
  Gilbert Kanyankore (2016)
  Jimmy Mulisa (2016)
  Antoine Hey  (2017–2018)
  François Karekezi
  Vincent Mashami (2018–2022)
  Carlos Alós (2022–present)

Players

Current squad
The following players were called up for the 2023 AFCON qualification matches against Benin on 22 and 27 March 2023.
Caps and goals correct as of 19 November 2022, after the match against .

Recent call-ups
The following players have been called up for Rwanda in the last 12 months.

DEC Player refused to join the team after the call-up.
INJ Player withdrew from the squad due to an injury.
PRE Preliminary squad.
RET Player has retired from international football.
SUS Serving suspension.

Player records

Players in bold are still active with Rwanda.

Most capped players

Top goalscorers

Competition records

FIFA World Cup record

Africa Cup of Nations record

African Nations Championship record

CECAFA Cup record

Honours
CECAFA Cup:
Winners (1): 1999
Runners-up (6): 2003, 2005, 2007, 2009, 2011, 2015.

See also
 Rwanda national under-17 football team

References

External links

Official Website
Rwanda at the FIFA website
 Rwanda at CAF Online
Official Facebook
Official Twitter
Rwanda national football team picture

Discover Rwanda

 
African national association football teams